Pasandeh-ye Olya (also Romanized as Pasandeh-ye ‘Olyā; also known as Pasandeh-ye Bālā) is a village in Langarud Rural District, Salman Shahr District, Abbasabad County, Mazandaran Province, Iran. At the 2006 census, its population was 622, in 175 families.

References 

Populated places in Abbasabad County